Boston Express is a subsidiary bus company of Concord Coach Lines that operates between New Hampshire and Boston. It serves locations between Logan Airport and southern New Hampshire, including Nashua and destinations along Interstate 93 as far north as Manchester.

Routes

Fleet
The fleet originally consisted entirely of Motor Coach Industries D4500 coaches. In 2017, the company began replacing these with Prevost X3-45 coaches, which, as of February 2020, account for 22 of the 25-bus fleet. All buses are painted white with blue graphics.

References

Intercity bus companies of the United States
Bus transportation in Massachusetts
Bus transportation in New Hampshire
Companies based in Merrimack County, New Hampshire
Transportation companies based in New Hampshire